Fairbourne is a seaside village in Gwynedd, Wales. Located on the coast of Barmouth Bay in Arthog community, to the south of the estuary of the River Mawddach, it is surrounded by Snowdonia National Park. It is in an area that had been listed by Gwynedd Council for managed retreat due to rising sea levels.

History 
Fairbourne is part of the historic county of Meirionnydd. The area was originally salt marshes and slightly higher grazing lands. Before development began in the mid-19th century, there were three farms on the land. The coastal area was originally known as Morfa Henddol, while the promontory outcrop now occupied by the Fairbourne Hotel was called Ynysfaig.

Circa 1865, Solomon Andrews, a Welsh entrepreneur, purchased the promontory. Over the next few years, he built a seawall for tidal protection and several houses. To facilitate this, he built a  gauge horse-drawn tramway from the main railway to the site in order to bring in building materials. In 1916, the tramway was converted to a  gauge steam railway. The wealthy flour-maker Sir Arthur McDougall had been looking for a country estate but when he discovered this area, he soon conceived of it as a seaside resort. In July 1895, Arthur McDougall purchased a substantial acreage from land speculators, which he enlarged by additional lots the following year. He then immediately hired a builder to begin the development of a model seaside resort.

Unusually for Gwynedd county, the village has no official Welsh-language name. Unlike most of Gwynedd, where Welsh is the majority language, English is the predominant language in Fairbourne with most of its inhabitants coming from or descended from those who came from England.

Sea level rise management 
Fairbourne had been identified as unsustainable to defend, given predicted sea level rise. The best estimate was that the area would be abandoned between 2052 and 2062, though the range of uncertainty was between 2042 and 2072. However, based on current rates of sea level rise it would take 100 to 200 years from 2014 to reach 0.5 metres. There was an intent to maintain defences of the village for a period of only 40 years from 2014. This policy of managed retreat was strongly opposed by local residents.

In November 2021, government officials declared that by 2052, it would no longer be safe/sustainable to live in the viilage. This has been disputed by a number of research reports.

In 2021 a survey was carried out by Arthog Community Council to obtain the views of Fairbourne residents to the proposed plans for the village. There was a feeling by residents that their concerns were being ignored, and that Fairbourne was being selected for decommissioning without adequate justification.  “Having attended the multi-agency meeting in the village hall, residents are ‘stone walled’, not listened to, and told what to do without our views being considered.” "It has been stressed at public meetings and acknowledged by Natural Resources Wales that local knowledge is important. Is Gwynedd Council just relying on consultants with computers?”

In March 2022, the issue of Fairbourne was raised in the Welsh Senedd by Mabon ap Gwynfor AS: "The west of Wales shoreline management plan is based on work done 10 years ago. Now, since then, of course, a great deal of work has been done on coastal flood defences, which changes the forecast for communities such as Fairbourne, but the plans haven't changed to reflect this work... There is room to doubt the modelling of Natural Resources Wales, which is based on inadequate data and old software." 

In May 2022, Arthog Community Council approved a motion to reject the plans by Gwynedd Council to decommission Fairbourne village, citing various failings in the decision making process.

In November 2022, Huw Williams of Gwynedd Council stated: "The Fairbourne Moving Forward Project Board has been aware of the negative impact on the community as a consequence of the mention of ‘decommissioning’ Fairbourne in ‘2054’ by the press and other stakeholders"...."There are no current plans to decommission the village".

Attractions

Beach 
The beach is a two-mile stretch of sand, backed by a steep storm beach of pebbles which is as high as the sea defences in some places. At the northern end the beach joins the Mawddach Estuary, while at the southern end of the beach is squeezed between sheer cliffs and the sea. The beach is a venue for people exercising their dogs, however, during the summer months there is a dog ban enforced on the central area. There is access to the beach for those visitors with prams and/or wheelchairs. The beach is fronted by tank traps known as "Dragon's Teeth" dating from the Second World War. The beach regularly meets the European Blue Flag criteria.

Railway and Ferry 
The Fairbourne Railway has provided a link from the village to Penrhyn Point for over a century. It runs regular passenger services between April and October.

The Barmouth Ferry sails from the seaward end of the Fairbourne Railway to Barmouth/Abermaw.

Transport 
Fairbourne railway station is served by the Cambrian Coast Railway, which runs from Machynlleth to Pwllheli and is operated by Transport for Wales.

Lloyds Coaches also operate a regular bus service to Dolgellau and Tywyn.

References 

 W.J.Milner Rails through the Sand. Rail Romances, Chester, 1996.

External links 

 www.geograph.co.uk : photos of Fairbourne and surrounding area

Seaside resorts in Wales
Villages in Gwynedd
Arthog
Managed retreat